Rüdiger Hoffmann (born March 30, 1964, in Paderborn) is a German comedian.

Life 
Hoffmann works as comedian on German television.

Comedian Works by Hoffmann 
 1995: Der Hauptgewinner
 1997: Es ist furchtbar aber es geht (with Jürgen Becker)
 1998: Asien. Asien.
 2000: Ich komme...!
 2003: Ekstase
 2005: Kostbarkeiten – Das Beste aus 5 Programmen
 2006: Rüdiger Hoffmann – Das Beste vom Besten live
 2007: Der Atem des Drachen
 2007: Sex oder Liebe
 2010: Das beste aus 25 Jahren
 2010: Obwohl
 2015: Aprikosenmarmelade

Films 
 2004: 7 Dwarves – Men Alone in the Wood
 2006: 7 Zwerge – Der Wald ist nicht genug

Awards 
 1989: St. Ingberter Pfanne
 1994: Salzburger Stier
 1996: Goldene Schallplatte for Der Hauptgewinner
 1999: Goldene Europa in category Comedy
 1999: Echo in category Comedy
 2003: Goldene Schallplatte for Ich komme …!

References

External links 

 Official website by Rüdiger Hoffmann

German male comedians
1964 births
People from Paderborn
Living people